Valentin Zarnik (Repnje, 14 February 1837 - Laibach, 30 March 1888) was a Slovenian lawyer, nationalist politician and writer.

References

1837 births
1888 deaths
People from the Municipality of Vodice
Young Slovenes politicians
Members of the Austrian House of Deputies (1871–1873)
Members of the Diet of the Duchy of Carniola